Mansa is a city and municipal council in Mansa district of Punjab, India. It is the administrative headquarters of Mansa district and is situated on the Bathinda-Jind-Delhi railway line and also on the Barnala-Sardulgarh-Sirsa state highway.

The population is Punjabi-speaking and is wedded to the Malwa culture of Punjab. Mansa is situated in the cotton belt of Punjab. Indeed, agriculture forms the backbone of the district economy. During the months of November and December a visitor to this part of Punjab shall be the proud witness to the pristine, milky white bloom of cotton. Mansa has a Temple of Baba Bhai Gurdas Ji in the southeast of the town; a fair is held on March–April Season at the temple.

Geography
It has an average elevation of 212 metres (695 feet).

Ancient period

The modern town of Mansa was founded by or on the name of Faqeer Mana or Baba Mana in 18th or 19th century. The ancient history of the Mansa district has been traced to the Indus Valley civilization. The archaeological finding at different villages of Mansa district are almost similar to those of Harappa and Mohanjodaro. Rakhigarhi, the biggest Indus Valley Civilization town, is very near to Manasa, in Haryana. Manasa is divided into three parts Pre-Harappa, Harappa and Late Harappan period. It is believed that Shri Baba Bhai Gurdas had lived here during his last times.

History

Mansa was formerly a part of Phulkian Sikh Dynasty (1722–1948) then part of Kaithal Sikh Kingdom (1762–1857).

The city is said to have been founded by Bhai Gurdas who hailed from Dhingar, Mansa district. He is said to have been married at this place among the Dhaliwal Jat Sikh. Once he came to his in-laws to take his wife along with him but they refused to send her. At this, Bhai Gurdas sat in meditation before the house of his in-laws. After some time, the parents of the girl agreed to send their daughter with Bhai Gurdas. But he refused to take her along with him, stating that he had now renounced the worldly way of life. In his memory, his Smadh was constructed where a fair is held every year in March–April. People in large numbers attend the fair and offer Laddus and Gur (Jaggery) at Smadh. Class ‘A’ Municipality has been functioning in the town since 1952.

Sports
There is a cricket academy which provides coaching facilities for young cricketers and a Kabaddi stadium where International Kabaddi Cup was contested.

Education 

Mansa is a city with the lowest education metrics in the state, although the students of this town have done well in medical/engineering areas. The students have excelled in state exams as well as country's top institutions.

The town has three Colleges, viz. Nehru Memorial Government College, Mata Sundri Girls College and S.D. Kanya Mahavidyala College.

Past few years have seen some changes in the field of education but more developments need to be done for growth of the city.

Transport

Mansa is well linked to other cities, particularly the national capital, New Delhi, by an efficient rail and transport system. The nearest airports are located at New Delhi and Chandigarh which are 248 km and 180 km away by road respectively. New airports will be in working soon at Ludhiana, International Airport at Bhatinda. It is connected by rail and situated on the Delhi–Bathinda branch line of Northern Railway. Many trains like New Delhi–Bathinda Intercity Express, Ferozepur Mumbai Janta Express, Bikaner Guwahati (Avadh Assam Express)and Punjab Mail arrive at Mansa railway station. Besides, there are several passenger trains running between New Delhi and Mansa at regular intervals daily.
Mansa is well connected to all the cities of Punjab by bus routes.

Notable people
Harbhajan Singh Manshahia, Indian politician, former cabinet minister (excise and taxation) during the chief ministership of Lachhman Singh Gill
Dr. Mukhdeep Singh Manshahia, Indian computer scientist in artificial intelligence, assistant professor at Punjabi University 

Ajmer Singh Aulakh, Indian writer in Punjabi
Aman Dhaliwal, Indian model and actor
Deep Dhillon, Indian singer and actor
Gavie Chahal, Indian actor of film and television
Kulwinder Billa, Indian singer and actor
Nirmal Rishi, Indian actress
Sawarn Singh, Indian Olympian, Arjuna Award winner, from the village of Dalelwala
Shipra Goyal, Indian singer
Sidhu Moose Wala, Indian singer, lyricist and actor
Sukhmeet Singh, Indian rower, Asian Games 2018 gold medalist, from the village of Kishangarh Pharwahi
Vijay Singla, Indian politician, member of  Aam Aadmi Party

Demographics

 2011 census, Mansa had a population of 82,956. Mansa has an average literacy rate of 58.08%: male literacy is 63.70%, and female literacy is 51.74%. In Mansa, 11.02% of the population is under 6 years of age.

References

External links
 Mansa District website

Cities and towns in Mansa district, India